The Flag Officer, Middle East was a command appointment of the Royal Navy, established for two distinct periods from 194658 and then from . From  the appointment was located in the Suez Canal Zone or, after the Suez Crisis, in the Cyprus area; when reestablished from the post of Flag Officer, Arabian Seas and Persian Gulf, the focus was on the other side of Arabia. The headquarters moved from HMS Juffair in Bahrain to HMS Sheba, Steamer Point, Aden in 1962, and was located there until the British evacuation from Aden in 1967.

In August 1946 the title Commander-in-Chief, Levant was discontinued. Instead the title Senior British Naval Officer and Flag Officer Liaison, Middle East was adopted. In 1958 the last Commander-in-Chief, East Indies, hauled down his flag. His former units and establishments were transferred to the joint-service Middle East Command at Aden. In 1959 the former East Indies Persian Gulf Division and Red Sea division were amalgamated under the Commodore, Arabian Seas and Persian Gulf. In early 1962, the Flag Officer moved his headquarters from Bahrain to Aden, and by that time, the title Flag Officer Middle East was in use again.

In October 1967, Middle East Command in Aden was abolished, and the remaining naval forces 'East of Suez' were transferred to the Far East Fleet.

Flag Officer Middle East, 1946 - 58

Bahrain and Aden, 1959-67

Flag Officer, Arabian Seas and Persian Gulf
Post holders included:

Flag Officer, Middle East
Post holders included:

References 

M
1967 disestablishments
Military units and formations disestablished in 1967